The Catholic Church in South Africa is part of the worldwide Catholic Church composed of the Latin Church and 23 Eastern Catholic Churches, of which the South African church is under the spiritual leadership of the Southern African Catholic Bishops Conference and the Pope in Rome. It is made up of 26 dioceses and archdioceses plus an apostolic vicariate.

In 1996, there were approximately 3.3 million Catholics in South Africa, making up 6% of the total South African population. Currently, there are 3.8 million Catholics. 2.7 million are of various black African ethnic groups, such as Zulu, Xhosa, and Sotho. Coloured and white South Africans each account for roughly 300,000.

Roman Catholic evangelization efforts have traditionally focused on Black South Africans. In the 1950s, however, an effort began to evangelize Afrikaans-speakers, who had previously been ignored by Catholic missionaries. Success in the Afrikaans Apostolate remained minimal until the death throes of Apartheid during the mid to late 1980s. As Catholic texts began to be translated into Afrikaans, sympathetic Dutch Reformed pastors, who were defying the traditional anti-Catholicism of their Church, assisted in correcting linguistic errors. By 1996, the majority of Afrikaans-speaking Catholics came from the Coloured community, with a smaller number of Afrikaner converts, most of whom were from professional backgrounds.

Most White South African Catholics are English speakers, and the majority are descended from Irish immigrants. Many others are Portuguese South Africans, many of whom emigrated from Angola and Mozambique after they became independent and disintegrated into civil war during the 1970s. Others are descended from immigrants from other European countries, such as South Africa's Italian community. The proportion of Catholics among the predominantly Calvinist white Afrikaans speakers, or Asian South Africans who are mainly Hindus or Protestant of Indian descent, is extremely small.

Organisation

Jurisdictions
The Catholic Church in South Africa consists of five Archdioceses (Bloemfontein, Cape Town, Durban, Johannesburg, and Pretoria), 22 Dioceses, 2 Vicariates Apostolic and a Military Ordinariate. The five Ecclesiastical provinces are— 
Bloemfontein 
Leadership: Archbishop Zolile Peter Mpambani S.C.J., appointed 1 April 2020
Contains the following dioceses:
Bethlehem
Bishop Jan de Groef, M. Afr. appointed 31 December 2008.
Keimoes-Upington – Upington, Northern Cape
Bishop Edward Risi, O.M.I. appointed 14 October 2000.
Kimberley
Bishop Duncan Theodore Tsoke, appointed 03 March 2021
Kroonstad
Bishop Peter Holiday, appointed 1 April 2011
Cape Town
Leadership: Archbishop Stephen Brislin appointed 18 December 2009 and Auxiliary Bishop Sylvester Anthony John David OMI, appointed 6 June 2019
Contains the following dioceses:
Aliwal
Bishop Joseph Mary Kizito appointed 15 November 2019
De Aar
Bishop Adam Leszek Musiałek SCJ, appointed 17 July 2009.
Oudtshoorn
Bishop Noel Andrew Rucastle appointed 4 May 2020
Port Elizabeth
Bishop Vincent Mduduzi Zungu OFM, appointed 2 February 2014.
Queenstown
Bishop Paul Siphiwo Vanqa SAC, appointed 03 March 2021
Durban 
Leadership: Archbishop Siegfried Mandla Jwara CMM, appointed 9 June 2021. 
Contains the following dioceses:
Dundee
Bishop Graham Rose appointed 13 June 2008.
Eshowe
Vacant.
Kokstad
Bishop Thulani Victor Mbuyisa CMM, appointed 6 April 2022. 
Mariannhill
Bishop Pius Mlungisi Dlungwana, appointed 3. June 2006 and Coadjutor Bishop Neil Augustine Frank OMI, appointed 17 December 2021.
Umtata
Bishop Anton Sipuka appointed 8 February 2008.
Umzimkulu
Bishop Stanisław Jan Dziuba, O.S.P.P.E. appointed 31 December 2008.
Vicariate Apostolic of Ingwavuma
Vacant
Johannesburg
Leadership: Archbishop Buti Tlhagale OMI appointed 8 April 2003
Contains the following dioceses:
Klerksdorp
Bishop Victor Hlolo Phalana appointed 25 January 2015
Manzini (Geographically external to South Africa – In eSwatini)
Bishop José Luís Gerardo Ponce de León IMC appointed 29 November 2013.
Witbank
Bishop Thaddaeus Kumalo appointed 25 November 2020.
Pretoria
Archbishop Dabula Anthony Mpako appointed 30 April 2019 and Auxiliary Bishop Masilo John Selemela, appointed 16 July 2022
Contains the following dioceses:
Gaborone (Geographically external to South Africa – In Botswana)
Bishop Frank Atese Nubuasah, S.V.D, appointed 6 June 2019
Polokwane
 Bishop Jeremiah Madimetja Masela appointed 10 June 2013.
Rustenburg
Bishop Robert Mogapi Mphiwe appointed 25 November 2020
Tzaneen
Bishop Joao Rodrigues appointed 28 January 2010
Francistown (Geographically external to South Africa – In Botswana)
Bishop Anthony Pascal Rebello SVD, appointed 5 July 2021. 
Military Ordinariate of South Africa
Leadership: Archbishop Dabula Anthony Mpako appointed 30 April 2019.

Southern African Catholic Bishops Conference
The Southern African Catholic Bishops Conference is a collegial body approved by the Holy See and has as its particular aim:

Apostolic Nuncio
The Apostolic Nuncio to South Africa is Archbishop Peter Bryan Wells appointed to the post on 9 February 2016. He was also the Apostolic Nuncio to Botswana, Lesotho, Swaziland and Namibia.

Catholic Church and apartheid
Denis Hurley, Archbishop of Durban and a member of the Central Preparatory Committee of Vatican II, stands perhaps as the most eminent Catholic cleric in South African history. He was appointed bishop at the age of 31 and was a leader in opposing the apartheid regime. Like him, many senior officials within the Catholic Church in South Africa opposed apartheid, but a group of white Catholics formed the South African Catholic Defence League to condemn the church's political involvement and, in particular, to denounce school integration.

People
Roy Campbell, South African poet, Catholic convert, and critic of Stalinism, Nazism, and Apartheid. 
Blessed Benedict Daswa, a Catholic convert from the Lemba people. First South African Blessed & Martyr
Christopher Hope, South African journalist, playwright, and poet. In the memoir, White Boy Running, Hope relates his experiences coming from an Irish Catholic South African family, which dealt in different ways with the anti-Catholic face of Afrikaner nationalism.
Denis Hurley, see above
Owen McCann (1907–1994), President of the Southern African Catholic Bishops Conference (SACBC); cardinal.
Wilfrid Napier is currently South Africa's only cardinal.
Franz Pfanner, Trappist Abbot and candidate for Roman Catholic Sainthood
Benedict Wallet Vilakazi, a linguist and Roman Catholic convert of royal descent from among the Zulu people. Also a radically innovative Zulu language poet, who combined the traditional Izibongo and other conventions of Zulu literature with both poetic meters and themes drawn from the European Romantic poetry of the 18th and early 19th centuries.

Education
 Catholic schools in South Africa
 Catholic secondary schools in South Africa
St Augustine College of South Africa

In popular culture
 The Syringa Tree, an award-winning stage play by Pamela Gien, relates the life story of Elizabeth Grace, a White South African Catholic girl, during the Apartheid era and its aftermath.

References

Sources
 St Joseph's theological Institute (Cedara)
 Provides links to the structure and personnel history. Used heavily for diocesan and personnel information in the section on structure and leadership.

External links
http://www.sacbc.org.za is the website of the South African Bishops' Conference
http://www.adct.org.za is the website of the Archdiocese of Cape Town
http://www.staugustine.ac.za is the South African Catholic University

 
Catholic Church by country